David Hill may refer to:

Politicians 
 David Hill (Oregon politician) (1809–1850), American politician, founder of the city of Hillsboro, Oregon
 David B. Hill (1843–1910), American politician, Governor of New York 1885–1891, U.S. Senator from New York 1892–1897
 David Jayne Hill (1850–1932), American academic, diplomat and author, U. S. Assistant Secretary of State 1898–1903
 David Hill (Canadian politician) (b. circa 1978), Canadian politician, Ottawa city councillor

Sportspeople 
 David Hill (cricketer) (1915–1974), Guyanese cricketer
 David Hill (Rangers footballer) (fl. 1881–1882), Scottish international football player (Rangers and Scotland)
 David Hill (footballer, born 1881) (1881–1928), Scottish international football player (Third Lanark and Scotland)
 David Hill (footballer, born 1965), English footballer for Bradford City
 David Hill (rugby league) (active 1967–78), British rugby league player (Wigan and Great Britain)
 David Hill (tight end) (born 1954), American football player (Detroit Lions)
 David Hill (wide receiver) (born 1977), American football player
 David Hill (rugby union) (born 1978), New Zealand rugby union player
 David Hill (swimmer), British Paralympic swimmer

Other people 
 David Octavius Hill (1802–1870), Scottish painter and arts activist
 David Hill (missionary) (1840–1896), Wesleyan Methodist missionary to China
 David Hill (Mohawk) (1745–1790), Mohawk chief
 David Haworth Hill (1851–1926), British-born Australian civil servant and philatelist
 David Keynes Hill (1915–2002), British physiologist
 Tex Hill (David Lee Hill, 1915–2007), American fighter pilot and flying ace born in Korea
 David Hill (author) (born 1942), New Zealand author of fiction
 David Hill (businessman) (born 1946), Australian businessman
 David Hill (producer), American executive producer of television, mainly with the Fox organization
 David Hill (choral director) (born 1957), British choral conductor and organist
 David Hill (musician and businessman) (active 1994 and after), former member of the band Ballistic Brothers and founder of Nuphonic record label
 David Hill (Labour adviser), British political adviser
 David Mark Hill (1960–2008), American spree killer
 David Hess (AKA David Hill, 1936–2011), American actor, singer, and songwriter

See also 
 Colonel Guy Johnson and Karonghyontye (Captain David Hill), a 1776 portrait by Benjamin West
 David Hill memorial school, a school for blind girls in Hankou, China (1883–1911)
 David Octavius Hill Medal, a prize in photography established in 1955
 Dave Hill (disambiguation)
 Hill (surname)